Kul Bahadur K.C. (28 June 1946 - 14 March 2013) is one of the most significant Nepali poets. He is known for his well-rhymed poems that related to the social and economic problems of the common people who form the vast majority of the population in Nepal. He believed that the problems of the poor and the neediest had to be addressed at first so that they would be able to contribute to the sustained economic growth and the development of the country in the long run. He is known for his works "Mero Maato(मेरो माटो) from (Bijay Unmukh Achhyarharoo(विजय  उन्मुख  अक्षरहरू)", "Mutuka Jhilka(मुटुका झिल्का)", "Garib Ustai Chha(गरिब उस्तै छ)", "Ashauch Bardaichhan Kabitaharoo(आशौच बार्दैछन् कविताहरू)". "Poet Kul Bahadur KC was a patriot and naturalist poet, he wrote against the feudal, suppressing and exploiting nature prevalent in the society." said the contributors on the Memory book of Kul Bahadur KC

Books
The following are the works of Poet Kul Bahadur K.C. that have been published till date
 Mutuka Jhilka (मुटुका झिल्का), 2039 B.S. - A collection of poems
 Garib Ustai Chha (गरिब उस्तै छ), 2040 B.S. - A short narrative poem
 Gaunle (गाउँले), 2052 B.S. - A collection of poems
 Ashauch Bardaichhan Kabitaharoo (आशौच बार्दैछन् कविताहरू), 2061 B.S. - A collection of poems
 Bijay Unmukh Achhyarharoo (विजय  उन्मुख  अक्षरहरू), 2064 B.S. - A collection of poems
 Samaya-taranga (समय-तरङ्ग), PART I, 2067 B.S. - A collection of stray poems (Muktak)
 Alok (आलोक), 2067 B.S. - A long narrative poem
 Samayakaa Saugatharoo (समयका सौगातहरू), 2067 B.S. - A collection of poems
 Samaya-taranga (समय-तरङ्ग), PART II, 2068 B.S. - A collection of stray poems
 Ganga-Jamuna (गंगा-जमुना), under-publication - An epic

Awards
Poet Kul Bahadur KC has been awarded several awards in view of his contribution to Nepali literature, some of which are as follows;

See also
 Lekhnath Paudyal
 Laxmi Prasad Devkota
 Bhanubhakta Acharya
 Motiram Bhatta
 List of Nepalese poets

References

21st-century Nepalese poets
Nepali-language poets
Nepalese male poets
1946 births
2013 deaths
People from Pokhara